Thomas Bee (1739 – February 18, 1812) was a delegate to the Second Continental Congress, Lieutenant Governor of South Carolina and a United States district judge of the United States District Court for the District of South Carolina.

Education and career

Born in 1739 in Martigny, Province of South Carolina, British America, Bee attended the University of Oxford and read law in 1761. He entered private practice in Charleston from 1761 to 1762, and subsequently engaged in private practice from 1765 to 1769, 1769 to 1772, and 1782 to 1786, also engaging in planting. He was a member of the South Carolina Commons House of Assembly from 1762 to 1765, and from 1772 to 1776. He was a Justice of the Peace in 1775. He was a member of the Council of Safety in 1775 and 1776. He was a member of the South Carolina General Assembly from 1776 to 1778. He was a member of the South Carolina House of Representatives from 1778 to 1779, 1781 to 1782, and 1786 to 1788, serving as Speaker in January and February 1779. He was a commissioner for stamping and issuing paper bills of credit in Charleston in 1769. He was Lieutenant Governor of South Carolina in 1780. He was a delegate to the Second Continental Congress (Continental Congress) from 1780 to 1781. In 1781, Bee was elected a member of the American Philosophical Society. He was a member of the South Carolina Senate from 1788 to 1790.

Federal judicial service

Bee was nominated by President George Washington on June 11, 1790, to a seat on the United States District Court for the District of South Carolina vacated by Judge William Drayton Sr. He was confirmed by the United States Senate on June 14, 1790, and received his commission the same day. He published reports of the district court in 1810. His service terminated on February 18, 1812, due to his death in Pendleton, South Carolina. He was interred in Woodstock Cemetery in Goose Creek, South Carolina.

Bee was nominated by President John Adams to be Chief Judge of the United States Circuit Court for the Fifth Circuit on February 21, 1801, and was confirmed by the Senate on February 24, 1801, but he declined the appointment.

Family

Bee was the father of Barnard E. Bee Sr., who took part in the Texas Revolution and who was a political figure in the Republic of Texas, and the great grandfather of Carlos Bee, a United States representative from Texas. Two of Barnard's sons became known as Confederate generals during the American Civil War: Barnard Elliott Bee Jr. and Hamilton P. Bee.

References

Sources

 

1739 births
1812 deaths
18th-century American politicians
18th-century American judges
Bee family
Continental Congressmen from South Carolina
Judges of the United States District Court for the District of South Carolina
Lawyers from Charleston, South Carolina
Lieutenant Governors of South Carolina
Members of the South Carolina House of Representatives
Politicians from Charleston, South Carolina
South Carolina colonial people
South Carolina state senators
United States federal judges appointed by George Washington
United States federal judges admitted to the practice of law by reading law